Deunquat is an unincorporated community in Wyandot County, in the U.S. state of Ohio.

History
A post office was established at Deunquat in 1830, and remained in operation until 1928. The community was named in honor of a Wyandot chief.

References

Unincorporated communities in Wyandot County, Ohio
Unincorporated communities in Ohio
1830 establishments in Ohio